A list of American films released in 1987.

The Last Emperor won the Academy Award for Best Picture.



Top-grossing films
 Three Men and a Baby, starring Ted Danson, Steve Guttenberg and Tom Selleck
 Fatal Attraction, starring Michael Douglas, Glenn Close and Anne Archer
 Beverly Hills Cop II, starring Eddie Murphy, Judge Reinhold, John Ashton, Jürgen Prochnow, Brigitte Nielsen, Paul Reiser and Ronny Cox
 Good Morning, Vietnam, starring Robin Williams and Forest Whitaker
 Moonstruck, starring Cher, Nicolas Cage, Olympia Dukakis, Vincent Gardenia and Danny Aiello
 The Untouchables, starring Kevin Costner, Sean Connery, Andy Garcia, Charles Martin Smith and Robert De Niro
 The Secret of My Succe$s, starring Michael J. Fox, Helen Slater, Richard Jordan and Margaret Whitton
 Stakeout, starring Richard Dreyfuss, Emilio Estevez, Madeleine Stowe and Aidan Quinn
 Lethal Weapon, starring Mel Gibson, Danny Glover and Gary Busey
 The Witches of Eastwick, starring Jack Nicholson, Cher, Susan Sarandon and Michelle Pfeiffer

A

B-G

H-M

N-R

S-Z

See also
 1987 in American television
 1987 in the United States

External links

 
 List of 1987 box office number-one films in the United States

1987
Films
Lists of 1987 films by country or language